KVMI (1270 AM) is a commercial radio station licensed to Tulare, California, and serving the Tulare-Visalia area of Central California.  The station is currently owned by Momentum Broadcasting, LP, and it broadcasts a soft adult contemporary radio format, switching to Christmas music for part of November and December.

By day, KVMI transmits with 5,000 watts non-directional, but to avoid interference with other stations on 1270 AM, at night KVMI reduces power to 1,000 watts and uses a directional antenna.  Programming is also heard on two FM translators:  97.5 K248BX in Visalia and 98.5 K253CI in Exeter.

History
On , the station signed on as KCOK.  It initially transmitted with 250 watts on 1240 kHz. It moved to 1270 kHz in 1949, and increased power to 1,000 watts. In 1963, the station's daytime power was increased to 5,000 watts.

References

External links

VMI
Radio stations established in 1946
1946 establishments in California